Religion in Vanuatu is dominated by various branches of Christianity. Vanuatu is an archipelago made up of 13 larger islands, and approximately 70 smaller surrounding islands, each home to multitudes of diverse cultural and religious communities. As of 2020, the population of approximately 300,000 people speak as many as 145 languages throughout the island nation. Approximately 82% of the population of Vanuatu is Christian. An estimated 28% is Presbyterian, 12% Roman Catholic, 15% Anglican, and 12% Seventh-day Adventist. Groups that together constitute 15% include the Church of Christ , United Pentecostal Church, Assemblies of God, Neil Thomas Ministries, the Apostolic Church and other Christian denominations.

The John Frum Movement, a political party that also is an indigenous religious group, is centered on the island of Tanna and includes about 3% of the population. The Baháʼí Faith, Muslims, Buddhists, Jehovah's Witnesses, and the Church of Jesus Christ of Latter-day Saints (Mormons) also are active. There are believed to be members of other religions within the foreign community; they are free to practice their religions, but they are not known to proselytize or hold public religious ceremonies.

History
Christian missionization of Vanuatu began as early as 1606 upon the arrival of the Spanish explorer Pedro Fernandes de Queirós in Vanuatu. Missionaries representing several Western churches brought Christianity to the country in the 19th and early 20th centuries, specifically from Presbyterian, Catholic and Anglican missions. Some foreign missionaries continue this work; however, approximately 90% of the clergy of the established churches are now indigenous. The Summer Institute of Linguistics is active in translating the Bible into the country's many indigenous languages.

Because of the modernities that the military in World War II brought with them when they came to the islands, several cargo cults developed. Many died out, but the John Frum cult on Tanna is still large, and has adherents in the parliament. As well, Tanna is home to the Prince Philip Movement, which reveres the United Kingdom's Prince Philip. Villagers of the Yaohnanen tribe believed in an ancient story about the pale-skinned son of a mountain spirit venturing across the seas to look for a powerful woman to marry. Prince Philip, having visited the island with his new wife Queen Elizabeth, fit the description exactly and is therefore revered and even held as a god around the isle of Tanna.

The effects of colonial Christianity on Vanuatu culture 
The effects of colonialism and Christianization have differed enormously throughout Vanuatu, partially due to the Anglo-French condominium governance as well as due to the uncoordinated Christian missionization efforts throughout the nation. The diverse approaches of the Catholic mission, the Melanesian Mission and the Church of Christ combined with varied cultural communities resulted in vastly different local attitudes regarding religion, tradition, and community restructuring. Often, Ni-Vanuatu converted to Christianity in the hopes of attaining the apparent wealth and prosperity the European Christians possessed. Through the spread of Christianity, missionaries aimed to restructure indigenous societies by desegregating gendered eating and sleeping customs, prohibiting exclusive men’s houses, and reworking the idea of the domestic Ni-Vanuatu woman, in order to save women from what the missionaries saw as a “degraded state in kastom." In doing so, the missionaries inadvertently thrust Ni-Vanuatu women into the separate, but similarly gender-segregated Christian church, where men hold disproportionate power. While this new religious system upheld women in familial, motherly roles, it “stripped away those sacred aspects of human kinship which gave women a crucial if subordinated place in the ancestral religion."

The effects of Christianity on Vanuatu kastom 
As Christianity gained followers, eventually becoming the prominent religion, support of local kastom decreased due to missionaries’ habitual suppression of the incorporated local values, practices, and traditions. Kastom is an all-encompassing Bislama word that refers to traditional practices including culture, religion, art, economics, and magic in Vanuatu.

Vanuatu indigenous culture and kastom dramatically declined in the face of European colonization. The Europeans brought with them disease, weaponry and alcohol which lead to the death of indigenous peoples, as well as forcibly removed Ni-Vanuatu citizens, relocating them to Australia for forced labor. As well, European missionaries and Ni-Vanuatu Christian converts consciously oppressed certain kastom ways of life. While tolerance of kastom varied between churches, locations, and missions, the majority of Christians deemed the erasure of certain customs as a precondition to Christian conversion. Some of these practices included: “Polygyny, pig sacrifices, ‘idolatry,’ kava drinking, and men’s secret societies,” as missionaries believed such practices exemplified “heathenism” and “the powers of darkness.”

The roles of Christianity, kastom and national identity on the 1970s Vanuatu independence movement 
Kastom played a key role in mobilizing Vanuatu's independence movement in the 1970s, through establishing a national identity within a largescale resistance against Anglo-French colonialism. In 1971, Ni-Vanuatu Christian converts established the Vanuaaku Pati, originally named the New Hebrides National Party (NHNP), a political party which aimed to revive and maintain kastom as an essential part of Vanuatu nationalism. The Vanuaaku Pati highlighted the need for Vanuatu to break away from its colonizers, while simultaneously “emphasized the importance of kastom as a non-European ‘grass-roots’ force exemplifying the ‘Melanesian way’ as opposed to ‘the white man’s way.’

Prior to the 1979 national elections, the Vanuaaku Pati “published its electoral platform,” affirming protection of kastom within the government. The document outlined a plan to create a National Council of Chiefs, ultimately ensuring the inclusion of kastom via leaders with power within custom law.

National symbols of kastom and Christianity 

 The Vanuatu flag design, which features a boar's tusk symbolic of wealth and crossed palm leaves, a symbol of peace.
 The Vanuatu motto, "long God yumi stanap," translating to "before God we stand," appears alongside a warrior wearing traditional Vanuatu clothing, as well as a boar’s tusk and crossed palm leaves.
 The Vanuatu national anthem, Yumi Yumi Yumi, both acknowledges God as well as the importance of kastom. 
 Regarding God, the anthem states “God i givim ples ia long yumi / God i helpem yumi evriwan” translating to “God has given us this land / God helps us in our work."
 Regarding kastom, the anthem states “Plante fasin blong bifo i stap / Plante fasin blong tedei / Be yumi i olsem wan nomo / Hemia fasin blong yumi!” translating to "Many customs of before we have / Many customs from today / But we are all one / Despite our many ways!”
 Independence Week of July 1980, which included the presence of both Christian and kastom leaders, ceremonies, and celebrations, including church services, kastom dance, pig-killing, and traditional feasts.

Symbols and rituals of kastom in daily life 

 Nakamal - A men's meeting place
 Namele Leaves - Palm leaves from the Chief's Palm
 Pig Tusks
 Sand Drawing
 Naghol / Land Diving
 Kava Ceremonies

Freedom of religion

The Constitution of Vanuatu establishes the freedom of religion, and also states that the state is founded on a commitment to "traditional Melanesian values, faith in God, and Christian principles."

Religious groups are required to register with the government or face fines, but this law is not enforced in practice. Religious groups are allowed to establish private schools, and both private and public schools include optional religious education courses.

Since 2016, high ranking members of the government have expressed the intent to define Vanuatu as a Christian country and to prohibit other religions from entering the country. As of the end of 2017, no actual legislation has been passed to this effect.

The Baha'i Faith arrived in Vanuatu in 1953. Local administrative councils, or Spiritual Assemblies, were formed as soon as individual Baha'i communities were large enough. A regional administrative council for the south west pacific islands, including Vanuatu, was elected in 1964. Thirteen years later, in 1977, there were enough Baha'is in Vanuatu for them to elected their own separate National Spiritual Assembly. The community continued to grow sufficiently that in 2012 the erection of a local Baha'i House of Worship, or "Haos blong Wosip" in the local Bislama, was announced, serving as a space for people of all religions and backgrounds to gather, meditate, reflect, and worship. Ground was broken for the structure in 2019 and progress continues. At the groundbreaking ceremony, Vanuatu government officials and traditional leaders highlighted the importance of the local House of Worship on the island, stating that "This Temple will symbolize what we wish to see in Vanuatu in the years to come, which is peace and unity among us all, irrespective of belief" and describing that it "provides us a place where we can meditate deeply about our spiritual reality."

See also
 Islam in Vanuatu

References